Jean-Baptiste Dubourg (born 17 August 1987) is a French racing driver currently participating in the FIA World Rallycross Championship.

Biography
After winning the ice-racing series Andros Trophy of the 2015–2016 season with a Renault Clio Mk3 Prototype he will race in Euro RX for his own team DA Racing in 2016 using an all-new Citroën DS3 Supercar. His father is the 1992 European Autocross Champion Dominique Dubourg, while his younger brother Andréa Dubourg and girlfriend Adeline Sangnier are also rallycross drivers. After a second win in Andros Trophy in 2017, he compete in the FIA World Rallycross Championship  with a Peugeot 208.

Results

Complete FIA World Rallycross Championship results
(key)

Supercar

Complete FIA European Rallycross Championship results
(key)

Super1600

Supercar

References

1987 births
Living people
French racing drivers
European Rallycross Championship drivers
World Rallycross Championship drivers